Ahmed Al Busafy (born 1 September 1976) is an Omani former footballer. He played for Al-Seeb Club from 1999 to 2011 in the Omani League.

Club career statistics

International career
Ahmed was part of the first team squad of the Oman national football team till 2008. He was selected for the national team for the first time in 2002. He has represented the national team in the 2006 FIFA World Cup qualification.

National team career statistics

Goals for Senior National Team

Honours

Club
With Al-Seeb
Sultan Qaboos Cup (0): Runners-up 2003, 2005
Omani Federation Cup (1): 2007
Oman Super Cup (0): Runners-up 1999, 2004

References

External links

Ahmed Al-Busafy - GOALZZ.com
Ahmed Al-Busafy - KOOORA.com

1976 births
Living people
Omani footballers
Oman international footballers
Association football midfielders
Al-Seeb Club players
Oman Professional League players